Fox Point 157E is an Indian reserve of the Lac La Ronge Indian Band in Saskatchewan. It is 18 miles south-east of La Ronge, and on an island near the south shore of Lac la Ronge.

References

Indian reserves in Saskatchewan
Division No. 18, Saskatchewan